The Fortifications of Brussels refers to the medieval city walls that surrounded Brussels, Belgium, built primarily to defend the city but also for administrative reasons. There were two stages of fortifications of Brussels; the first walls, built in the early 13th century, and the second walls, built in the late 14th century and later upgraded. Today, only a few sections of either remain.

First walls
The first walls of Brussels were a series of fortifications erected around Brussels in the early 13th century. The city quickly outgrew them, and starting in 1356, a second, larger set of walls was built to better enclose and defend the city. The now superfluous walls were dismantled between the 16th and 18th centuries. Isolated portions of the first walls can still be seen today.

Construction
Construction on the first walls of Brussels is estimated to have taken place at the beginning of the 13th century, under the reign of Henry I, the first duke of Brabant. The beginning and end dates are not clear, but construction would have lasted several decades. On the other hand, from historical maps and other documents which have been preserved, the precise former course of the walls is known.

In the west, they encompassed Saint-Géry/Sint-Goriks Island (the site of the city's founding and first development, where today's / are located), the Grand-Place/Grote Markt (the city's main square), and the first port on the river Senne. They extended to the heights in the east of the city, enclosing the first Cathedral of St. Michael and St. Gudula (then a collegiate church) on the Treurenberg hill ("Mount of tears"), where the St. Gudula Gate stood (integrated in these first walls), and which was later used as an ominously famous prison, hence its name, as well as the ducal palace of Coudenberg.

The walls were initially made of earth, with a wooden fence on top. These were buried underneath a talus, and they supported the main wall, which had a number of arrow slits in it. A second arcade supported a crenellated parapet, where defenders could stand. A large ditch was dug in front of the walls, and in places this could be flooded with water to form a moat if needed. Along the length of the walls, there were roughly forty defensive towers, in addition to seven primary gates and five smaller entrances.

Flemish invasion

The death of Duke John III of Brabant in 1355 sparked a succession crisis. As both of his sons had died, he left the throne to his daughter Joanna and her husband Wenceslaus I of Luxembourg. Count Louis II of Flanders had married Joan's younger sister Margaret and thought the throne should be his. Louis invaded Brabant and quickly seized Brussels, planting the Flemish lion flag in the middle of the Grand-Place. The city walls offered relatively little protection.

During the night of 24 October 1356, a group of Brabantian patriots led by Everard t'Serclaes scaled the city walls and drove the Flemings from the city. This enabled Joanna and Wenceslaus to make their Joyous Entry into Brussels, which would be seen as the equivalent of the Magna Carta for the Low Countries.

New walls proposed
Since the construction of the first walls in the 13th century, Brussels had grown extensively and had become quite important. On account of this growth, the first walls were no longer large enough, as the city had begun to spread out beyond them. It had become clear that further defences, better adapted to the current era, needed to be constructed. Following the succession crisis, city authorities decided to build a new set of walls. Everard 't Serclaes, who had been named schepen (alderman), was among those contributing to the decision.

Second walls
The second walls of Brussels were erected between 1356 and 1383. The wall was to have a length of nearly 8 km (5 mi), which was enough to enclose the surrounding hamlets and fields that supplied the city. There were to be 72 semicircular towers along the wall. There were seven main gates, corresponding to the seven entries into the first walls of Brussels, but the similarities mostly end there. The second walls were a monumental project and represented a colossal undertaking for the period. The design was fairly typical of medieval defences before the introduction of gunpowder, and was surrounded by a moat in the lower parts of the city. The two sets of walls coexisted until the 16th century, when the original set of walls began to be dismantled.

Evolution of defences

In the 16th century, there were seven gates: Laeken, Flanders, Anderlecht, Halle, Namur, Leuven and Schaerbeek, each named for the direction of the road leading out of the gate. An eighth was added in 1561, the Canal Gate, designed to control access to Brussels' port from the newly constructed Willebroek Canal.

In the 16th and 17th centuries, new siege weapons and techniques, including the advent of artillery, forced the city to modernise the defences in order to keep potential attackers at a safe distance from the walls, including the addition of ditches, bastions and ravelins. Monterey Fort was the most important defensive work, its name coming from the Spanish count responsible for modernising the defences. The fort was built between 1672 and 1675 on the heights of Obbrussel ('Upper Brussels', now Saint-Gilles), south of the Halle Gate, by the military engineers Merex and Blom. As with the rest of the city's fortifications, the fort was ineffective, and was not able to prevent the French bombardment of Brussels in 1695, from the heights of Scheut, in Anderlecht, as part of the War of the Grand Alliance. The defensive works proved equally ineffective when French troops seized the city in 1746 during the War of the Austrian Succession, afterwards leaving the defensive works in ruins. By that time, siege was no longer an important part of warfare. Due to the growth of commerce and improved roads, the fortifications did little more than frustrate transit into and out of the city.

In 1782, Emperor Joseph II ordered the dismantling of most fortifications in the Low Countries, including those of Brussels. The dismantling work of the exterior defences began in the east of the city. Monterey Fort was sold and destroyed, and all of the Gates were razed with the exception of the Laeken Gate and the Halle Gate.

In 1795, when Republican France invaded and annexed the Low Countries, the demolitions were stopped, not resuming until an order from Napoleon in 1804. The Laeken Gate was destroyed in 1808. By an ordinance on 19 May 1810, the French dictator ordered the second walls demolished and replaced by boulevards with a median in the centre. The fall of the First French Empire prevented the project's immediate execution.

Construction of the Small Ring

With the return of stability, in 1818, authorities organised a contest for plans to demolish the ramparts and replace them with boulevards suited to the exigencies of contemporary life in the city. The proposal of Jean-Baptiste Vifquain was ultimately chosen. It involved construction of squares and boulevards, with spaces to walk and two to four rows of trees lining the route, a main road and parallel side roads. A barrier with a ditch running its length was still installed, however, and toll pavilions built at the entrances, to allow continued taxation of commercial goods entering the city. The extension of the canal to the west of the city was also envisioned, but that would not be effected until the construction of the Brussels–Charleroi Canal around 1830. The work was to be financed by selling the land that was freed up, although this took over twenty years to do.

In 1830, as Belgium gained its independence, demolition work had reached the Halle Gate. Since its closing, it had served as a military prison, and later as storage of archives. The new government decided to spare it. In 1840, the street just inside of the gate was raised , making it impassable to vehicles. From 1868 to 1871, as the city was being modernised, the architect Henri Beyaert, with little regard for historical accuracy, transformed the austere medieval tower into something of a neo-Gothic castle, which fit better with the contemporary romantic perception of the Middle Ages.

In 1860, the taxes on commercial goods were lifted, and the last barrier between Brussels and its suburbs was destroyed. The intersections at the Anderlecht Gate and the Ninove Gate are the only two where the toll pavilions still stand. Those of the Namur Gate were moved, and now stand at the end of the Avenue Louise/Louizalaan, at the entrance to the Bois de la Cambre/Ter Kamerenbos. 

Although modified, the Halle Gate is the last remnant of the second walls of Brussels. Their course can be seen by the current Small Ring, although it stops short of the Halle Gate, and they still define downtown Brussels, often called the Pentagon. In the 1950s, with pressure from the automobile, new plans to improve traffic flow were implemented, partly due to the 1958 Brussels World's Fair (Expo '58). Later tunnels were dug, and one of the main lines of the Brussels Metro now runs primarily underneath the Small Ring. Today, the Small Ring is a major arterial ring road.

Gallery

First walls

Second walls

See also

 History of Brussels
 Belgium in "the long nineteenth century"

References

Notes

Bibliography
 Astrid Lelarge, La démolition du rempart et des fortifications aux XVIIIe et XIXe siècles. Bruxelles, l'émergence de la ville contemporaine (in French), 2001, 
 Claire Dickstein-Bernard, La construction de l'enceinte bruxelloise de 1357. Essai de chronologie des travaux (in French), in: Brusselse cahiers, vol. 35, 1995–96, p. 91–128
 Gérard Sand e.a., Clés et défense d'une ville: Bruxelles et son histoire = Sleutel en verdediging van een stad: Brussel en haar geschiedenis (in French–Dutch), Brussels, Gemeentekrediet, 1984

Further reading/guidebooks
  La Première Enceinte de Bruxelles, Corinne Licoppe (ed.), no. 29 in the series Bruxelles, Ville d'Art et d'Histoire, Ministère de la Région de Bruxelles-Capitale, Service des Monuments et Sites, 2001
  La Porte de Hal - Temoin silencieux d'une histoire tumultueuse, Linda Wullus, Musées Royaux d'Art et d'Histoire, 2006

Brussels
Buildings and structures in Brussels
History of Brussels
Buildings and structures completed in the 13th century
Buildings and structures completed in 1383
Buildings and structures completed in the 14th century